The Russkaya Station was a former Soviet and Russian Antarctic research station that was located on the Ruppert Coast, in Marie Byrd Land in Western Antarctica. The station was proposed in 1973 and approved in 1978.  Construction began the next year and it was opened on March 9, 1980 and officially abandoned in 1990.

The station was mothballed in the beginning of 1990.  In February 2006, Valeriy Lukin, the head of the Russian Antarctic Expedition (RAE), stated that There are plans to open the mothballed stations Molodyozhnaya, Leningradskaya and Russkaya in the 2007–2008 season. However, by 2012 it was reported that reactivation plans, although delayed, had not commenced.

Climate
For the shore of Antarctica, the winds are considered to be rather strong.

See also
 List of Antarctic research stations
 List of Antarctic field camps
 Soviet Antarctic Expedition
 Crime in Antarctica

Further reading 
 James G. Bockheim, The Soils of Antarctica, PP  185 – 194

References

External links
 Official website Arctic and Antarctic Research Institute
 AARI Russkaya Station page
 COMNAP Antarctic Facilities
 COMNAP Antarctic Facilities Map

Outposts of Marie Byrd Land
Soviet Union and the Antarctic
Russia and the Antarctic
1980 establishments in Antarctica
1990 disestablishments in Antarctica